Major General Francis David Rome,  (1905–1985) was a senior officer in the British Army who served as Commandant of the British Sector in Berlin from 1956 to 1959.

Military career
Rome was commissioned into the British Army in 1925. He transferred to the Royal Fusiliers in 1927. He served in the Second World War, latterly as commander of 111th Indian Infantry Brigade. After the war he became commander of 3rd Parachute Brigade in Palestine from 1946 and then commander of 1st Parachute Brigade in Palestine from 1947. He was appointed Assistant Commandant at the School of Land/Air Warfare in 1948 and Deputy Adjutant General at Far East Land Forces in 1950. He was then made General Officer Commanding 16th Airborne Division in 1953 and Commandant of the British Sector in Berlin in 1956; he retired in 1959. He also served as colonel of the Royal Fusiliers.

Family
In 1936 Rome married Sybil Parry Carden.

References

External links
Generals of World War II

|-
 

|-

1905 births
1985 deaths
Companions of the Order of the Bath
Companions of the Order of St Michael and St George
Commanders of the Order of the British Empire
Companions of the Distinguished Service Order
British Army generals
Royal Fusiliers officers
British military personnel of the Palestine Emergency
British Army brigadiers of World War II